The Trinidad River (Mexico) is a river of Oaxaca state in Mexico.

It originates in the Sierra de Villa Alta sub-range of the Sierra Madre de Oaxaca and flows northeastwards onto the Gulf Coastal Plain, where it joins the Lalana River to form the San Juan River. The San Juan is a tributary of the Papaloapan River, which empties into the Gulf of Mexico.

See also
List of rivers of Mexico

References
Atlas of Mexico, 1975 (http://www.lib.utexas.edu/maps/atlas_mexico/river_basins.jpg).
The Prentice Hall American World Atlas, 1984.
Rand McNally, The New International Atlas, 1993.

Rivers of Oaxaca
Papaloapan River
Sierra Madre de Oaxaca